Raymond Lee may refer to:

 Raymond Lee (director), Hong Kong director and television producer
 Raymond Lee (soccer) (born 1993), American soccer player
 Raymond Lee (actor) (born 1987), American actor
Raymond Lee (film historian)
 Raymond Harry Shoon Lee, Hong Kong politician, doctor and educator
 Ray Lee, former English footballer who played as a right winger